Cardiovascular Research is a medical journal published monthly by the Oxford University Press on behalf of the European Society of Cardiology.  The journal publishes original and review articles from all areas of basic, translational, and clinical cardiovascular disease.

According to the Journal Citation Reports, the impact factor was 10.787 in 2020, ranking the journal 12th out of 138 journals in the 'Cardiac & Cardiovascular systems' category.

The editor-in-chief is Tomasz J. Guzik.

History 
The journal was established in 1967 by the British Medical Association on behalf of the British Cardiovascular Society, with John P. Shillingford as the founding editor-in-chief.  In 1995, ownership of the journal moved to the European Society of Cardiology and Elsevier became the publisher.

Editors-in-chief 
John P. Shillingford 1967-1974 

R. J. Linden 1975-1982 

Peter Sleight 1983-1991 

David J. Hearse 1992-1995 

Michiel J. Janse 1995- 2003 

Hans Michael Piper 2003-2013 

Karin Sipido 2013-2018 

Tomasz J. Guzik 2018-

References 

English-language journals
Cardiology journals
Academic journals associated with learned and professional societies
Oxford University Press academic journals
Publications established in 1967